Magnesite is a mineral with the chemical formula  (magnesium carbonate). Iron, manganese, cobalt, and nickel may occur as admixtures, but only in small amounts.

Occurrence 
Magnesite occurs as veins in and an alteration product of ultramafic rocks, serpentinite and other magnesium rich rock types in both contact and regional metamorphic terrains. These magnesites are often cryptocrystalline and contain silica in the form of opal or chert.

Magnesite is also present within the regolith above ultramafic rocks as a secondary carbonate within soil and subsoil, where it is deposited as a consequence of dissolution of magnesium-bearing minerals by carbon dioxide in groundwaters.

Isotopic structure: clumped isotope 
The recent advancement in the field of stable isotope geochemistry is the study of isotopic structure of minerals and molecules. This requires study of molecules with high resolutions looking at bonding scenario (how heavy isotopes are bonded to each other)- leading to knowledge of stability of molecule depending on its isotopic structure. 

Oxygen has three stable isotopes (16O, 17O and 18O) and Carbon has two (13C, 12C). A 12C16O2 molecule (composed only with most abundant isotopes of constituent elements) is called a 'monoisotopic' species. When only one atom is replaced with heavy isotope of any constituent element (ie, 13C16O2), it is called a 'singly-substituted' species. Likewise, when two atoms are simultaneously replaced with heavier isotopes (eg., 13C16O18O), it is called a  'doubly substituted' species. The 'clumped' species (13C16O18O) for CO2 is a doubly substituted CO2 molecule. Isotopically substituted molecules have higher mass. As a consequence, molecular vibration reduces and the molecule develops a lower zero point energy (see Kinetic isotope effect).

The abundances of certain bonds in certain molecules are sensitive to temperature at which it formed (e.g., abundance of 13C16O18O in carbonates as 13C-18O bond). This information has been exploited to form the foundation of clumped isotope geochemistry. Clumped isotope thermometers have been established for carbonate minerals like dolomite, calcite, siderite etc and non-carbonate compounds like methane and oxygen. Depending on the strength of cation-carbonate oxygen (ie, Mg-O, Ca-O) bonds- different carbonate minerals can form or preserve clumped isotopic signatures differently.

Measurements and reporting 
Clumped isotopic analysis has certain aspects to it. These are:

Digestion, analysis and acid fractionation correction 
Clumped isotopic analysis is usually done by gas source mass spectrometry where the CO2 liberated from magnesite by phosphoric acid digestion is fed into the isotope ratio mass spectrometer. In such scenario, one needs to ensure that liberation of CO2 from magnesite is complete. Digesting magnesite is hard since it takes a long time and different labs report different digestion times and temperatures (from 12 hours at 100 °C to 1 hour at 90 °C in phosphoric acid). Due to digestion at this high temperature, some of the 13C-18O bonds in the liberated CO2 are broken (leading to reduction in abundance of 'clumped' CO2) during phosphoric acid digestion of carbonates. To account for this additional (analytical artifact), a correction called the 'acid fractionation correction' is added to the magnesite clumped isotope value obtained at temperature of digestion.

Since the CO2 gas is liberated from carbonate mineral during acid digestion, leaving one O behind- a fractionation occurs, and the isotopic composition of the analyzed CO2 gas needs to be corrected for this. For magnesite, the most reliable fractionation factor(α) equation is given as:

103ln(α) = [(6.845 ± 0.475)∗105/T2] + (4.22 ± 0.08); T in K

Different researchers have also used other fractionation factors like dolomite fractionation factor.

Standards 
While measuring samples of unknown composition, it is required to measure some standard materials (see Reference materials for stable isotope analysis). With internal standards and reference materials, analytical session is routinely monitored. Standard materials are majorly calcite and marble.

Δ47 - Temperature calibration 
To convert clumped isotope data into temperature, a calibration curve is required which expresses the functional form of temperature dependence of clumped isotope composition. No mineral specific calibration exists for magnesite. Based on some experimental data where mineral precipitation temperature and clumped isotope derived temperature doesn't match, a need of mineral specific calibration emerges. The mismatch arises since bonding in magnesite is different from calcite/dolomite and/or acid digestion is conducted at higher temperature.

Magnesite-water and CO2-magnesite isotope fractionation factors 
Using clumped isotope derived temperature, C and O isotopic composition of the parental fluid can be calculated using known magnesite-fluid isotope fractionation factors, since fractionation is temperature dependent. Reported magnesite-fluid O and C isotope fractionation factors in literature are not in agreement with each other. The fractionation behaviors have not been substantiated by experimental observation.

Factors controlling isotopic structure in magnesite

Conversion from hydrous Mg-carbonates to magnesite 
In low temperature, thus, hydrous Mg-carbonates (hydromagnesite, nesquehonite etc.) form. It is possible to convert these phases into magnesite by changing temperature by mineral dissolution-precipitation or dehydration. While so happens, an isotope effect associated can control the isotopic composition of precipitated magnesite.

Disequilibrium 
Disequilibrium processes like degassing, rapid CO2 uptake etc. modify clumped isotopic composition of carbonate minerals specifically at low temperatures. They variably enrich or deplete the system in heavy isotopes of C and O. Since clumped isotope abundance depends on abundance of isotopes of C and O, they are also modified. Another very prominent effect here is that of pH of precipitating fluid. As pH of precipitating fluid changes, DIC pool is affected and isotopic composition of precipitating carbonate changes.

Mineral structure and later thermal effects 
Crystalline and cryptocrystalline magnesites have very different mineral structures. While crystalline magnesite has a well developed crystal structure, the cryptocrystalline magnesite is amorphous- mostly aggregate of fine grains. Since clumped isotopic composition depends on specific bonding, difference in crystal structure is very likely to affect the way clumped isotopic signatures are recorded in these different structures. This leads to the fact that their pristine signatures might be modified differently by later thermal events like diagenesis/burial heating etc.

Formation 
Magnesite can be formed via talc carbonate metasomatism of peridotite and other ultramafic rocks. Magnesite is formed via carbonation of olivine in the presence of water and carbon dioxide at elevated temperatures and high pressures typical of the greenschist facies.

Magnesite can also be formed via the carbonation of magnesium serpentine (lizardite) via the following reaction:
2 Mg3Si2O5(OH)4 + 3 CO2 → Mg3Si4O10(OH)2 + 3 MgCO3 + 3 H2O

However, when performing this reaction in the laboratory, the trihydrated form of magnesium carbonate (nesquehonite) will form at room temperature. This very observation led to the postulation of a "dehydration barrier" being involved in the low-temperature formation of anhydrous magnesium carbonate. Laboratory experiments with formamide, a liquid resembling water, have shown how no such dehydration barrier can be involved. The fundamental difficulty to nucleate anhydrous magnesium carbonate remains when using this non-aqueous solution. Not cation dehydration, but rather the spatial configuration of carbonate anions creates the barrier in the low-temperature nucleation of magnesite.

Magnesite has been found in modern sediments, caves and soils. Its low-temperature (around ) formation is known to require alternations between precipitation and dissolution intervals. The low-temperature formation of magnesite might well be of significance toward large-scale carbon sequestration. A major step forward toward the industrial production of magnesite at atmospheric pressure and a temperature of 316 K was described by Vandeginste. In those experiments small additions of hydrochloric acid alternated periodically with additions of sodium carbonate solution. New was also the very short duration of only a few hours for the alternating dissolution and precipitation cycles.

Magnesite was detected in meteorite ALH84001 and on planet Mars itself. Magnesite was identified on Mars using infrared spectroscopy from satellite orbit. Near Jezero Crater, Mg-carbonates have been detected and reported to have formed in lacustrine environment prevailing there. Controversy still exists over the temperature of formation of these carbonates. Low-temperature formation has been suggested for the magnesite from the Mars-derived ALH84001 meteorite.

Magnesium-rich olivine (forsterite) favors production of magnesite from peridotite. Iron-rich olivine (fayalite) favors production of magnetite-magnesite-silica compositions.

Magnesite can also be formed by way of metasomatism in skarn deposits, in dolomitic limestones, associated with wollastonite, periclase, and talc.

Resistant to high temperature and able to withstand high pressure, magnesite has been proposed to be one of the major carbonate bearing phase in Earth's mantle and possible carriers for deep carbon reservoirs. For similar reason, it is found in metamorphosed peridotite rocks in Central Alps, Switzerland  and high pressure eclogitic rocks from Tianshan, China.

Magnesite can also precipitate in lakes in presence of bacteria either as hydrous Mg-carbonates or magnesite.

Information from isotopic structure 
Clumped isotopes have been used in interpreting conditions of magnesite formation and the isotopic composition of the precipitating fluid. Within ultramafic complexes, magnesites are found within veins and stockworks in cryptocrystalline form as well as within carbonated peridotite units in crystalline form. These cryptocrystalline forms are mostly variably weathered and yield low temperature of formation. On the other hand, coarse magnesites yield very high temperature indicating hydrothermal origin. It is speculated that coarse high temperature magnesites are formed from mantle derived fluids whereas cryptocrystalline ones are precipitated by circulating meteoric water- taking up carbon from dissolved inorganic carbon pool, soil carbon and affected by disequilibrium isotope effects.

Magnesites forming in lakes and playa settings are in general enriched in heavy isotopes of C and O because of evaporation and CO2 degassing. This reflects in the clumped isotope derived temperature being very low. These are affected by pH effect, biological activity as well as kinetic isotope effect associated with degassing. Magnesite forms as surface moulds in such conditions but more generally occur as hydrous Mg-carbonates since their precipitation is kinetically favored. Most of the times, they derive C from DIC or nearby ultramafic complexes (e.g., Altin Playa, British Columbia, Canada).

Magnesites in metamorphic rocks, on the other hand, indicate very high temperature of formation. Isotopic composition of parental fluid is also heavy- generally metamorphic fluids. This has been verified by fluid inclusion derived temperature as well as traditional O isotope thermometry involving co-precipitating quartz-magnesite.

Often, magnesite records lower clumped isotope temperature than associated dolomite, calcite. The reason might be that calcite, dolomite form earlier at higher temperature (from mantle like fluids) which increases Mg/Ca ratio in the fluid sufficiently so as to precipitate magnesite. As this happens with increasing time, fluid cools, evolves by mixing with other fluids and when it forms magnesite, it decreases its temperature. So the presence of associated carbonates have a control on magnesite isotopic composition.

Origin of Martian carbonates can be deconvolved with the application of clumped isotope. Source of the CO2, climatic-hydrologic conditions on Mars could be assessed from these rocks. Recent study has shown (implementing clumped isotope thermometry) that carbonates in ALH84001 indicate formation at low temperature evaporative condition from subsurface water and derivation of CO2 from Martian atmosphere.

Uses

Refractory material 

Similar to the production of lime, magnesite can be burned in the presence of charcoal to produce MgO, which, in the form of a mineral, is known as periclase. Large quantities of magnesite are burnt to make magnesium oxide: an important refractory (heat-resistant) material used as a lining in blast furnaces, kilns and incinerators.

Calcination temperatures determine the reactivity of resulting oxide products and the classifications of light burnt and dead burnt refer to the surface area and resulting reactivity of the product (this is typically determined by an industry metric of the iodine number).

'Light burnt' product generally refers to calcination commencing at 450 °C and proceeding to an upper limit of 900 °C – which results in good surface area and reactivity.

Above 900 °C, the material loses its reactive crystalline structure and reverts to the chemically inert 'dead-burnt' product- which is preferred for use in refractory materials such as furnace linings.

In fire assay, magnesite cupels can be used for cupellation, as the magnesite cupel will resist the high temperatures involved.

Other uses 
Magnesite can also be used as a binder in flooring material (magnesite screed). Furthermore, it is being used as a catalyst and filler in the production of synthetic rubber and in the preparation of magnesium chemicals and fertilizers.

Research is proceeding to evaluate the practicality of sequestering the greenhouse gas carbon dioxide in magnesite on a large scale. This has focused on peridotites from ophiolites (obducted mantle rocks on crust) where magnesite can be created by letting carbon dioxide react with these rocks. Some progress has been made in ophiolites from Oman. But the major problem is that these artificial processes require sufficient porosity-permeability so that the fluids can flow but this is hardly the case in peridotites.

Artworks 
Magnesite can be cut, drilled, and polished to form beads that are used in jewelry-making. Magnesite beads can be dyed into a broad spectrum of bold colors, including a light blue color that mimics the appearance of turquoise.

The Japanese-American artist Isamu Noguchi used magnesite as a sculptural material for some of his artworks.

Occupational safety and health 
People can be exposed to magnesite in the workplace by inhaling it, skin contact, and eye contact.

United States 
The Occupational Safety and Health Administration (OSHA) has set the legal limit (permissible exposure limit) for magnesite exposure in the workplace as 15 mg/m3 total exposure and 5 mg/m3 respiratory exposure over an 8-hour workday. The National Institute for Occupational Safety and Health (NIOSH) has set a recommended exposure limit (REL) of 10 mg/m3 total exposure and 5 mg/m3 respiratory exposure over an 8-hour workday.

References 

 Smithsonian Rock and Gem 

Magnesium minerals
Carbonate minerals
Calcite group
Trigonal minerals
Minerals in space group 167
Luminescent minerals
Evaporite